Marie-José Nadal-Gardère (1931-2020) is a Haitian painter and sculptor. Born in Port-au-Prince, Nadal-Gardère studied in France and later Canada, where she learned ceramics and metal sculpting. Her works have been exhibited throughout Canada, the United States, the Caribbean, and western Europe. She is the owner of the Marassa Gallery in Pétion-Ville, a suburb of Port-au-Prince.

References
 

1931 births
Haitian painters
Haitian sculptors
Living people
Haitian women painters
21st-century women artists